Labial consonants are consonants in which one or both lips are the active articulator. The two common labial articulations are bilabials, articulated using both lips, and labiodentals, articulated with the lower lip against the upper teeth, both of which are present in English. A third labial articulation is dentolabials, articulated with the upper lip against the lower teeth (the reverse of labiodental), normally only found in pathological speech. Generally precluded are linguolabials, in which the tip of the tongue contacts the posterior side of the upper lip, making them coronals, though sometimes, they behave as labial consonants.

The voiceless bilabial fricative, voiced bilabial fricative, and the bilabial approximant do not exist as the primary realizations of any sounds in English, but they occur in many languages. For example, the Spanish consonant written b or v is pronounced, between vowels, as a voiced bilabial approximant.

Lip rounding, or labialization, is a common approximant-like co-articulatory feature. English  is a voiced labialized velar approximant, which is far more common than the purely labial approximant [β̞]. In the languages of the Caucasus, labialized dorsals like /kʷ/ and /qʷ/ are very common.

Very few languages, however, make a distinction purely between bilabials and labiodentals, making "labial" usually a sufficient specification of a language's phonemes. One exception is Ewe, which has both kinds of fricatives, but the labiodentals are produced with greater articulatory force.

Lack of labials
While most languages make use of purely labial phonemes, a few generally lack them. Examples are Tlingit, Eyak (both Na-Dené), Wichita (Caddoan), and the Iroquoian languages except Cherokee.

However, it is not always clear to what extent the lips are involved in such sounds. In the Iroquoian languages, for example,  involved little apparent rounding of the lips. See the Tillamook language for an example of a language with "rounded" consonants and vowels that do not have any actual labialization. All of these languages have seen labials introduced under the influence of English.

See also
Labialization
Index of phonetics articles

References

 McDorman, Richard E. (1999). Labial Instability in Sound Change: Explanations for the Loss of /p/. Chicago: Organizational Knowledge Press. .

Place of articulation